Margrete Helle Auken (born 6 January 1945) is a Danish politician who has been serving as a Member of the European Parliament (MEP) since 2004. She is a member of the Socialistisk Folkeparti, part of the European Green Party. She was also formerly a Member of the Folketing.

Auken was educated at the University of Copenhagen and is a sognepræst (parish priest) at the Frederiksberg Church in the Church of Denmark.

Political career
Auken was a member of the Danish parliament from October 1979 to December 1990 and from September 1994 to June 2004.

When she was elected as the sole candidate for SF for the European Parliament in 2004 Auken sparked an uproar in SF by choosing to join the European Green Party – European Free Alliance instead of the European United Left – Nordic Green League without the approval of SF.

In parliament, Auken has been serving on the Committee on the Environment, Public Health and Food Safety since 2014. She had previously been a member of the Committee on Transport and Tourism (2004-2007), the Committee on Development (2005-2009). In 2007 she also joined the Committee on Petitions.

In addition to her committee assignments, Auken is a member of the delegation for relations with Palestine. She is also part of the European Parliament Intergroup on the Welfare and Conservation of Animals and the European Parliament Intergroup on Seas, Rivers, Islands and Coastal Areas.

Auken was re-elected in 2019.

Personal life
Auken's brother is Svend Auken. She has three children. Her daughter Ida Auken is also a priest and politician, though since 2014 she has been a member of the Danish Social Liberal Party, unlike her mother. The younger Auken was Minister of the Environment in the Cabinet of Helle Thorning-Schmidt I.

References

External links
 
 

1945 births
Living people
University of Copenhagen alumni
Danish Lutheran clergy
Socialist People's Party (Denmark) MEPs
MEPs for Denmark 2004–2009
MEPs for Denmark 2009–2014
MEPs for Denmark 2014–2019
MEPs for Denmark 2019–2024
21st-century women MEPs for Denmark
Politicians from Aarhus
Women Lutheran clergy
Women members of the Folketing
Members of the Folketing 1979–1981
Members of the Folketing 1981–1984
Members of the Folketing 1984–1987
Members of the Folketing 1987–1988
Members of the Folketing 1988–1990
Members of the Folketing 1990–1994
Members of the Folketing 1994–1998
Members of the Folketing 1998–2001
Members of the Folketing 2001–2005